The 1888 Texas gubernatorial election was held to elect the Governor of Texas. Incumbent Governor Lawrence Sullivan Ross was re-elected to a second term in a landslide over Francis Marion Martin, running on a fusion opposition ticket.

General election

Candidates
Lawrence Sullivan Ross, incumbent Governor (Democratic)
Francis Marion Martin, former Lieutenant Governor and candidate for Governor in 1886 (Prohibition-Fusion)

Results

References

1888
Texas
1888 Texas elections